This article is about the particular significance of the year 2005 to Nigeria and its people.

Incumbents

Federal government
 President: Olusegun Obasanjo (PDP)
 Vice President: Atiku Abubakar (PDP)
 Senate President: Adolphus Wabara (PDP) (Until 5 April); Ken Nnamani (PDP) (Starting 5 April)
 House Speaker: Aminu Bello Masari (PDP) 
 Chief Justice: Muhammad Lawal Uwais

Governors
 Abia State: Orji Uzor Kalu (PDP)
 Adamawa State: Boni Haruna (PDP)
 Akwa Ibom State: Victor Attah (PDP)
 Anambra State: Chris Ngige (PDP)
 Bauchi State: Adamu Mu'azu (PDP)
 Bayelsa State: Diepreye Alamieyeseigha (PDP)
 Benue State: George Akume (PDP)
 Borno State: Ali Modu Sheriff (ANPP)
 Cross River State: Donald Duke (PDP)
 Delta State: James Ibori (PDP)
 Ebonyi State: Sam Egwu (PDP)
 Edo State: Lucky Igbinedion (PDP)
 Ekiti State: Ayo Fayose (PDP)
 Enugu State: Chimaroke Nnamani (PDP)
 Gombe State: Mohammed Danjuma Goje (PDP)
 Imo State: Achike Udenwa (PDP)
 Jigawa State: Ibrahim Saminu Turaki (APP)
 Kaduna State: Ahmed Makarfi (PDP)
 Kano State: Ibrahim Shekarau (ANPP)
 Katsina State: Umaru Yar'Adua (PDP)
 Kebbi State: Adamu Aliero (APP)
 Kogi State: Ibrahim Idris (PDP)
 Kwara State: Bukola Saraki (PDP)
 Lagos State: Bola Tinubu (AC)
 Nasarawa State: Abdullahi Adamu (PDP)
 Niger State: Abdulkadir Kure (PDP)
 Ogun State: Gbenga Daniel (PDP)
 Ondo State: Olusegun Agagu (PDP)
 Osun State: Olagunsoye Oyinlola (PDP)
 Oyo State: Rashidi Adewolu Ladoja (PDP)
 Plateau State: Joshua Dariye (PDP)
 Rivers State: Peter Odili (PDP)
 Sokoto State: Attahiru Bafarawa (APP)
 Taraba State: Jolly Nyame (PDP)
 Yobe State: Bukar Ibrahim (APP)
Zamfara State: Ahmad Sani Yerima (ANPP)

Events
 May 30 - 1st Africa Movie Academy Awards take place in Yenagoa.
 June 28 - Air Nigeria is established.
 December 10 - Sosoliso Airlines Flight 1145 crashes at Port Harcourt International Airport.

Deaths
 August 31 - Sam Okoye, football goalkeeper who represented Nigeria during the 1999 FIFA World Youth Championship born 1980.

References

 
Years of the 21st century in Nigeria